Despistado is a Canadian indie rock band from Regina, Saskatchewan.

History
Despistado was active from 2001 to 2004. The band consisted of vocalist and guitarist Dagan Harding, guitarist Leif Thorseth, bassist Joel Passmore and drummer Brenan Schwartz.

Despistado released their first EP, The Emergency Response, in 2002 (produced by David j Taylor); it was subsequently re-released in 2004 on Jade Tree Records. Widely hyped as a "next big thing", the band's single "A Stirstick's Prediction" was used in a commercial for T-Mobile.  In 2004, "A Stirstick's Prediction" was contributed to the compilation album "Take Action! Vol 4". 

After many cross-Canada tours in 2004 which reportedly left the band exhausted and riven by personal tensions, they returned home to prepare for an international tour in the fall; due to family obligations, Passmore declined to participate in the fall tour through the United States with The Weakerthans, and was temporarily replaced by Robin Sernich. By Christmas the band had broken up. Their full-length album The People of and Their Verses, completed before the band's breakup, was subsequently released on Jade Tree in 2005.

Passmore is currently in the bands Sylvie and Rah Rah. Dagan Harding is preparing to release his second solo album, as well as playing with Thorseth in the band Geronimo throughout the late 2000s. Schwartz played with Anatta and Porticoast prior to those bands breaking up.

The band undertook a brief reunion tour in 2009. They again reunited in 2013 for a tour of Western Canada, performing some new material during the latter tour. The band planned for a vinyl reissue of The People of and Their Verses, and have acknowledged but not yet officially confirmed to the media the possibility of recording a new album in the future.

Discography
 The Emergency Response (2002)
 The People of and Their Verses (2005)

See also

Music of Canada
Music of Saskatchewan
Canadian rock
List of Canadian musicians
List of bands from Canada
:Category:Canadian musical groups

References

Musical groups established in 2001
Musical groups disestablished in 2004
Canadian indie rock groups
Musical groups from Regina, Saskatchewan
Jade Tree (record label) artists
Musical groups reestablished in 2013
2001 establishments in Saskatchewan
2004 disestablishments in Canada
2013 establishments in Saskatchewan